An All-American team is an honorary sports team composed of the best amateur players of a specific season for each team position—who in turn are given the honorific "All-America" and typically referred to as "All-American athletes", or simply "All-Americans". Although the honorees generally do not compete together as a unit, the term is used in U.S. team sports to refer to players who are selected by members of the national media. Walter Camp selected the first All-America team in the early days of American football in 1889. The 2018 NCAA Women's Basketball All-Americans are honorary lists that will include All-American selections from the Associated Press (AP), the United States Basketball Writers Association (USBWA), and the Women's Basketball Coaches Association (WBCA) for the 2017–18 NCAA Division I women's basketball season. Both AP and USBWA choose three teams, while WBCA lists 10 honorees.

A consensus All-America team in women's basketball has never been organized. This differs from the practice in men's basketball, in which the NCAA uses a combination of selections by AP, USBWA, the National Association of Basketball Coaches (NABC), and the Sporting News to determine a consensus All-America team. The selection of a consensus All-America men's basketball team is possible because all four organizations select at least a first and second team, with only the USBWA not selecting a third team.

Before the 2017–18 season, it was impossible for a consensus women's All-America team to be determined because the AP had been the only body that divided its women's selections into separate teams. The USBWA first named separate teams in 2017–18. The women's counterpart to the NABC, the Women's Basketball Coaches Association (WBCA), continues the USBWA's former practice of selecting a single 10-member (plus ties) team. The Sporting News does not select an All-America team in women's basketball.

By selector

Associated Press (AP)

AP Honorable Mention 

 Ariel Atkins, Texas
 Kenisha Bell, Minnesota
 Tashia Brown, Western Kentucky
 Natalie Butler, George Mason
 Bridget Carleton, Iowa State
 Chennedy Carter, Texas A&M
 Lauren Cox, Baylor
 Sophie Cunningham, Missouri

 Katelynn Flaherty, Michigan
 Loryn Goodwin, Oklahoma State
 Marie Gülich, Oregon State
 Ruthy Hebard, Oregon
 Kaylee Jensen, Oklahoma State 
 Maria Jespersen, South Florida
 Brooke McCarty, Texas
 Brittany McPhee, Stanford

 Tinara Moore, Central Michigan
 Teana Muldrow, West Virginia
 Kia Nurse, UConn
 Jaime Nared, Tennessee
 Shakayla Thomas, Florida State
 Morgan William, Mississippi State
 Imani Wright, Florida State

United States Basketball Writers Association (USBWA)

Women's Basketball Coaches Association (WBCA)

By player

References

All-Americans
NCAA Women's Basketball All-Americans